Fersman may refer to:

 Alexander Fersman
 Fersman (crater)
 Fersman Mineralogical Museum